North Chatham is a hamlet in Columbia County, New York, United States. North Chatham has a post office with ZIP code 12132.

Most or all of the hamlet is included in the North Chatham Historic District, which is listed on the National Register of Historic Places.

References

Hamlets in Columbia County, New York
Hamlets in New York (state)